Paul Marshall (28 April 1961 – 23 May 2009) was a British swimmer. He competed in two events at the 1980 Summer Olympics. He died from cancer in 2009, and was the only black swimmer to compete for Great Britain at the Olympics.

References

External links
 

1961 births
2009 deaths
British male swimmers
Olympic swimmers of Great Britain
Swimmers at the 1980 Summer Olympics